Elton Gregory Snowden  is an American attorney and politician. A Republican, he served from 2012 to 2020 as speaker pro tempore of the Mississippi House of Representatives, representing district 83.

References

External links
 
 Snowden at Mississippi House of Representatives

1954 births
21st-century American politicians
Baptists from Mississippi
Living people
Republican Party members of the Mississippi House of Representatives
Mississippi lawyers
Politicians from Meridian, Mississippi
University of Alabama alumni